"People from Ibiza" is a song by Croatian singer-songwriter Sandy Marton from his debut studio album, Modern Lover (1986).

Track listing and formats 

 Italian 7-inch single

A. "People from Ibiza (Edit A)" – 3:42
B. "People from Ibiza (Edit B)" – 4:10

 Italian 12-inch single

A. "People from Ibiza" – 8:20
B1. "People from Ibiza (Instrumental)" – 6:00
B2. "People from Ibiza (Another Version of)" – 3:00

Credits and personnel 

 Sandy Marton – songwriter, vocals
 Claudio Cecchetto – songwriter, producer
 Mario Flores – engineering
 Daniele Delfitto – mastering
 Jay Burnett – mixing
 Nino Lelli – arranger
 Pippo Ingrosso – cover art, photographer
 Maurizio Marani – cover art designer

Credits and personnel adopted from the Modern Lover album and 7-inch single liner notes.

Charts

Weekly charts

Certifications and sales

See also 

 List of number-one hits of 1984 (Italy)

References 

1984 songs
1984 singles
Number-one singles in Italy
Sandy Marton songs
Song recordings produced by Claudio Cecchetto
Songs about Ibiza
Songs written by Sandy Marton